Angela R. Bryant (born December 9, 1951) is an American Democratic politician who currently serves as a member of the North Carolina Post-Release Supervision and Parole Commission (a full-time position). From 2007 through 2018, she served in the North Carolina General Assembly.

Bryant represented the 7th district in the North Carolina House of Representatives starting with her appointment in 2007 to fill a vacancy caused by the resignation of Ed Jones upon his appointment to the state Senate. She was re-elected in 2008, 2010, and 2012. In 2013, she was selected by a committee of local Democrats and then appointed by Governor Pat McCrory (who was required to accept the local committee's selection), to fill the seat of state Sen. Ed Jones, who had died after being re-elected in the 2012 general election. She represented District 4 in the North Carolina Senate (including constituents in Halifax, Nash, Vance, Warren, and Wilson counties).

References

External links

|-

North Carolina General Assembly - Senator Angela Bryant official website
Project Vote Smart - Angela R. Bryant (NC) profile
Follow the Money - Angela Bryant
2008 campaign contributions

Democratic Party members of the North Carolina House of Representatives
Democratic Party North Carolina state senators
Living people
Women state legislators in North Carolina
1951 births
African-American women in politics
African-American state legislators in North Carolina
21st-century American politicians
21st-century American women politicians
21st-century African-American women
21st-century African-American politicians
20th-century African-American people
20th-century African-American women